João Gabriel Ramos de Souza (born 12 February 1996), commonly known as João Gabriel, is a Brazilian footballer who currently plays as a forward for Japanese side Tochigi City.

Club career
João Gabriel joined Sagamihara in early 2017 from Cruzeiro.

Statistics

Notes

References

External links

 JLeague Profile

1996 births
Living people
Brazilian footballers
Brazilian expatriate footballers
Association football forwards
Red Bull Brasil players
Cruzeiro Esporte Clube players
SC Sagamihara players
Tochigi City FC players
Kagoshima United FC players
J3 League players
Brazilian expatriate sportspeople in Japan
Expatriate footballers in Japan
People from Matão